HSwMS Tre Kronor was a cruiser of the Royal Swedish Navy built during the Second World War.

History 
At the start of the war most of the ships of the Royal Swedish Navy were quite old and the navy was in need of new ships. In 1940 the government decided that three cruisers were to be built. A political debate broke out about the cruisers and works did not start until 1943.  The ship was to be built in Götaverken in Gothenburg. Eventually only two of the cruisers were built, and the third cruiser-squadron of the Coastal Fleet would be led by the modernised AA-cruiser .

The turrets used on HSwMS Tre Kronor were built by Bofors and were originally ordered by the Dutch Navy to be fitted on the two De Zeven Provinciën-class cruiser, but after the German occupation of the Netherlands the Swedish government was afraid they would be claimed by the Germans so they were confiscated.

Tre Kronor was launched 16 December 1944, commissioned on 25 October 1947, and served until 1 January 1964.

Captains
1947–1948: Erik af Klint
1949–1951: Erik Friberg
1954–1954: Harry Bong
1954–1955: Magnus Starck
1955–1956: Åke Lindemalm
1956–1957: Magnus Hammar
1957–1958: Anders Nilson

References 

Tre Kronor-class cruisers
Ships built in Gothenburg
1944 ships